The 1999 Pan American Aerobic Gymnastics Championships were held in Merida, Venezuela. The competition was organized by the Venezuelan Gymnastics Federation.

Medalists

References

1999 in gymnastics
International gymnastics competitions hosted by Venezuela
1999 in Venezuelan sport
Pan American Gymnastics Championships